Malcolm Kohll (born 5 November 1953 in South Africa) is a writer and film producer.

Education
He attended Rhodes University in Grahamstown, South Africa, where he trained as a journalist. On completing his course he came to London and did a post-graduate in Film and television, at Middlesex Polytechnic.

Career
He then wrote and co-produced the political true story, 'The Fourth Reich', about the Nazis' attempt to implant a Nazi government in South Africa during World War II, directed by Manie Van Rensburg, produced by David Selvan and starring Marius Weyers.

Malcolm Kohll's first filmed script was for the science fiction series Doctor Who. While he was at the BBC's Script Unit in early 1987 he was contacted by script editor Andrew Cartmel. Kohll began to develop a concept entitled The Flight of the Chimeron. Shortly before transmission, the decision was made to change the title to the more Fifties-sounding Delta and the Bannermen. Although Cartmel was interested in working with the writer again, Delta and the Bannermen proved to be Kohll's only involvement with Doctor Who, although he was later contacted about the 1996 revival of the series, coproduced by the BBC and Universal Television.

After that he worked on several film comedies, and some serious historical/political work, including a potential mini-series and a pilot for a TV comedy series called "Chastity Brogan-US Marshall."

Kohll's most famous project was as one of the producers of the film The 51st State starring Samuel L. Jackson and Robert Carlyle. He also co-wrote the script to the film The Bone Snatcher.

Producer
Other producer credits include 'Surviving Evil' starring Billy Zane and Natalie Mendoza, 'Chemical Wedding' by Iron Maiden front man Bruce Dickinson and starring Simon Callow, 'Secret Society' by director Imogen Kimmel and 'Julia's Ghost' directed by Bettina Wilhelm and written by Jane Corbett.

Currently
He is currently writing and producing a film called Heaven & Earth, which is at pre-production stage. The film is to be directed by Academy-Award winner Marleen Gorris and relates the true story of Dr James Miranda Barry, the first woman doctor, forced to masquerade as a man.

In addition Malcolm is adapting two South African thrillers, by Margie Orford (Blood Rose) and Deon Meyer (13 Hours), for director Roger Spottiswoode.

External links
 
Biography of Malcolm Kohll at On Target

1953 births
Alumni of Middlesex University
Living people
Rhodes University alumni
South African television writers